Rwanda-Rundi is a group of Bantu languages, specifically a dialect continuum, spoken in Central Africa. Two dialects, Kirundi and Kinyarwanda, have been standardized as national languages of Burundi and Rwanda respectively. These neighbouring dialects are mutually intelligible, but other dialects which are more distant ones, may not be. The other dialects are spoken in DR Congo (Kinyabwisha in North Kivu, Kinyamulenge in South Kivu), Uganda (Rufumbira spoken by the Bafumbira in Kisoro District), and Tanzania; Ha, with one million speakers, is the most widely spoken.

Comparison of Kinyarwanda and Kirundi
Kinyarwanda and Kirundi are very similar in many aspects, but differ in several ways as well.

Tonal marking
Both languages are tonal languages. High and low tones (or H and L) are the essential tones and, having a phonemic distinction on vowel length, when a long vowel changes from a low tone to a high tone it is marked as a rising tone and when a long vowel changes from a high tone to a low tone, it is marked as a falling tone. This is often illustrated in Kirundi in Meeussen's Rule. Propositions have also been made that tones can shift by a metrical or rhythmic structure.

Spelling

Word formation
There are many instances in which the two speech varieties of both languages have words that are slightly different. However, these differences do not continually recur. One has to memorize such differences as "-anga" in Kinyarwanda in contrast to "-anka" in Kirundi (meaning to dislike or hate), because the shift from "g" to "k" is extremely rare, with proof being words like "inka" (cow), "inkono" (pot) and many other words where "nk" is common in both dialects. Such  minor variations involve different consonants, vowels or vowel lengths, tones or affixes.

References

Sources
 

 
Languages of Burundi
Languages of Rwanda
Languages of Tanzania
Languages of the Democratic Republic of the Congo
Articles citing Nationalencyklopedin